WFHU (91.5 FM) is the callsign for the radio station out of Henderson, Tennessee. and is owned and overseen by Freed-Hardeman University.  It broadcasts with an effective radiated power of 10,500 Watts.  The station is run by a select number of students and is currently managed by Jesse Forkum and Sutherland Shrader.

WFHU, 91.5 the Lion format is primarily contemporary rock, the "best of the 80s, 90s and now".  Sunday mornings, called Gospel Sunday, has several religious programs as part of its form, ending with the live broadcast of the worship services of the Henderson Church of Christ, then going back to its regular format.  WFHU also airs the Freed-Hardeman Lions and Lady Lions Basketball, Baseball, and softball games, along with Chester County High School football. The station also has daily programming run by the station staff.

The station provides a live broadcast 24/7 on iHeart radio.

History
The idea of a radio station was started by members of the Board of Trustees of Freed-Hardeman College in 1965 to be the core of the new Communications Department being developed.  John R. Hall was chosen the first General Manager and the funds for the station was partially supplied by the 'Freed-Hardeman Associates', a fund raising group associated with the college.  The call letters WFHC was chosen.  A student staff was collected by Mr. Hall and the initial station was built in the lower level of the Student Center.  Although the staff worked to get the station operational in 1966 the first broadcast happened during 1967.

In 1979 WFHC increased its power from 10 Watts to 3000 Watts.  Also the station was moved from the student center to the Bible, Communications and World Evangelism Building, now known as the Gardner Center in 1982.  In 2000 the power was increased to 10,500 watts.

In 1991 WFHC hosted its 25th Anniversary by hosting an open house which allowed former members of the WFHC staff to take over the station.  They were joined by senior members of the staff at the time.  There was also a special dinner with members of the Board of Trustees and former General Manager John R. Hall as special guests.  In 2006 WFHU celebrated its 40th anniversary.

Due to the non-availability of the call sign "WFHU", which was assigned the United States Coast Guard, the call letters "WFHC" was not changed when Freed-Hardeman College went to University status in 1989.  It was not until 2005 when General Manager Ron Means was able to get the call letters released by the Coast Guard, when the call letters officially changed to ""WFHU"".

The WFHU motto WFHU 91-FIVE (originally WFHC, 91-FIVE) was created by Ray Eaton, a former student staff member, former General Manager and former Director of Broadcasting for FHU.  The unique logo, which had '91' with the call letters WFHC/U on top on the right side of the number, and the spelled out 'FIVE', with a line separating the call letters and FIVE, was created by student staff members David Florida and Jay Simmons in 1990.

The motto was changed a few years ago by Ron Means from 91-FIVE to the current motto of FM91.

In 2014, Freed-Hardeman laid off many staff members of the Communications department, and since then, students have had complete control of the radio station. The following year, the brand name for the station changed again from FM91 to 91.5 the Lion.

Current programming
Shows on WFHU include: The Rockshop, Gospel Sunday, Big Band Sounds, WoodSongs Old-Time Radio Hour, The Roadshow, and more.

The Rock Shop: Starting at 7 pm CST The Rock Shop brings its listeners a wide variety of rock which fits in with the variety format of the station. It starts off with soft rock and progressively gets harder throughout the night.

External links
 WFHU official website
 
 Freed-Hardeman University

Chester County, Tennessee
FHU
FHU